Degmaptera cadioui is a species of moth of the family Sphingidae first described by Ronald Brechlin and Ian J. Kitching in 2009. It is known from the Philippines.

References

Smerinthini